A firman, at the constitutional level, was a royal mandate or decree issued by a sovereign in an Islamic state. During various periods they were collected and applied as traditional bodies of law. The word firman comes from Persian  meaning "decree" or "order".

On a more practical level, a firman was, and may still be, any written permission granted by the appropriate Islamic official at any level of government. Westerners are perhaps most familiar with the permission to travel in a country, which typically could be purchased beforehand, or the permission to conduct scholarly investigation in the country, such as archaeological excavation. Firmans may or may not be combined with various sorts of passports.

Etymology 
Farmān (also spelled firman) is the modern Persian form of the word and descends from Middle Persian (Pahlavi) framān, ultimately from Old Persian framānā (fra = "fore", Greek πρό). The difference between the modern Persian and Old Persian forms stems from "dropping the ending ā and insertion of a vowel owing to the initial double consonant". This feature (i.e. fra-) was still used in the Middle Persian form. The Turkish form of the word farmān is fermān, whereas the Arabized plural form of the word is farāmīn.

Origins of firmans in the Ottoman Empire 
In the Ottoman Empire, the Sultan derived his authority from his role as upholder of the Shar'ia, but the Shar'ia did not cover all aspects of Ottoman social and political life. Therefore, in order to regulate relations and status, duties, and the dress of aristocracy and subjects, the Sultan created firmans.

Organization 

Firmans were gathered in codes called "kanun" (from the Hellenic word kanon (κανών) meaning rule or rules, as well as the Arabic word qanun also meaning rule or law). The kanun were "a form of secular and administrative law considered to be a valid extension of religious law as a result of the ruler's right to exercise legal judgement on behalf of the community."

When issued by the sultan in the Ottoman Empire, firmans' importance was often displayed by the layout of the document; the more blank space at the top of the document, the more important the firman was.

Examples of Ottoman firmans

Firman of Murad (26 October – 23 November 1386) 
In this firman, Sultan Murad I recognises a decree created by his father Sultan Orhan (c. 1324–1360).  He gives the monks all they owned during his father's reign, ordering that no one can oppress them or claim their land.

Firman of Mehmed the Conqueror (30 August 1473) 

From  he sent a series of letters announcing his victory, including an unusual missive in the Uyghur language addressed to the Turkomans of Anatolia.

Firman of Mehmed IV (1648–1687) 
In this firman, the monks of Mount Athos report that the administrative officials charged with the collection of taxes come at a later date than they are supposed to and demand more money than the value assessed. They also make illegal demands for additional food supplies.

Other firmans 

One of the most important firmans governing relations between Muslims and Christians is a document kept at the Saint Catherine's Monastery on the Sinai Peninsula in Egypt. This monastery is Greek Orthodox and constitutes the autonomous Sinai Orthodox Church. The firman bears the hand print of Muhammad, and requests the Muslims do not destroy the monastery for God-fearing men live there. To this day there is a protected zone around the monastery administered by the Egyptian government, and there are very good relations between the 20 or so monks, mainly from Greece, and the local community there.

Firmans were issued in some Islamic empires and kingdoms in India such as the Mughal Empire and the Nizam of Hyderabad. Notable were Emperor Aurangzeb's various firmans.

Other uses 
The term "firman" was used by the archeologist/novelist Elizabeth Peters for official permission from the Egyptian Department of Antiquities to carry on an excavation. A similar authority was cited by Austen Henry Layard for excavations at Nimrud which he mistakenly believed was Nineveh.

In the Old Yishuv Court Museum is held a firman for the 1890 opening of the printing business of Eliezer Menahem Goldberg, Jerusalem resident. The firman was translated into Hebrew from Turkish by Advocate Yosef Hai Fenizil, and shows that the business was located in Rehov Hayehudim and had permission to undertake printing in Turkish, Arabic, Hebrew, English, German, French and Italian.

Gallery

See also
 Firman of Karamanoğlu Mehmet Bey
 Firman of Mahbub Ali Khan
 Waqf
 Decree of Muharram

References

Further reading
 

Government of the Ottoman Empire
Islamic calligraphy
Documents
Safavid Iran
Qajar Iran
Persian words and phrases
Decrees